Their Finest Hour... and Then Some is a greatest hits album by Australian hard rock group The Angels, released in October 1992.  The album peaked at number76 of the ARIA Albums Chart.

Track listing 

Bonus tracks

Notes 
Part of the Alberts Classic Series reissues. Songs 16 - 19 are bonus tracks

Personnel 

Credited to:
 Chris Bailey – bass guitar
 Graham "Buzz" Bidstrup – drums
 John Brewster – guitar
 Rick Brewster – rhythm guitar
 Doc Neeson – lead vocals

Charts

References

The Angels (Australian band) compilation albums
1992 greatest hits albums
Albert Productions compilation albums
Mushroom Records compilation albums